A boyfriend is a regular male companion in a romantic or sexual relationship.

Boyfriend(s) or Boy Friend may also refer to:

Film, television and theatre
 The Boy Friend (1926 film), an American romantic comedy
 The Boy Friends, a 1930–1932 series of American comedy short films
 Boy Friend (1939 film), a 1939 American comedy film
 The Boy Friend (musical), a 1954 stage musical
 The Boy Friend (1971 film), a film adaptation of the stage musical
 Boy Friend (1961 film), an Indian Hindi film starring Shammi Kapoor, Madhubala and Dharmendra
 Boy Friend (1975 film), an Indian Malayalam movie released in 1975 directed by P. Venu
 "The Boyfriend" (Seinfeld), a 1992 episode of Seinfeld
 Boy Friend (1993 film), an Indian Hindi film featuring Beena Banerjee
 Boyfriends (film), a 1996 British film by Tom Hunsinger and Neil Hunter
 Boyfriend (2004 film), a 2004 Kannada film featuring Rathi
 Boy Friend (2005 film), an Indian Malayalam film directed by Vinayan
 Boyfriend (TV series), a 2018 South Korean television series

Music

Performers 
 Boyfriend (musician) (born 1988), a New Orleans-based rapper/performance artist
 Boyfriend (band), a South Korean band
 Boyfriends (Filipino band)
 The Boyfriends (UK band)

Albums 
 The Boyfriend (album), a 1986 album by Danny Wilde
 Boyfriend, a 1989 album by Boy George
 Boyfriend, a 2004 album by 5566

Songs 
 "Boyfriend" (Miki Fujimoto song), 2002
 "Boyfriend", by Schoolyard Heroes from The Funeral Sciences, 2003
 "Boyfriend" (Ashlee Simpson song), 2005
 "Boyfriend" (Alphabeat song), 2007
 "Boyfriend" (Best Coast song), 2010
 "Boyfriend" (Big Time Rush song), 2010
 "Boyfriend" (Lou Bega song), 2010
 "Boyfriend" (Mai Kuraki song), 2010
 "Boyfriend" (Boyfriend song), 2011
 "Boyfriend" (RaeLynn song), 2012
 "Boyfriend" (Justin Bieber song), 2012
 "Boyfriend" (Tegan and Sara song), 2016
 "Boyfriend" (Ariana Grande and Social House song), 2019
 "Boyfriend", by Tyler, the Creator from Igor, 2019
 "Boyfriend" (Mabel song), 2020
 "Boyfriend", by Hardy from A Rock, 2020
 "Boyfriend" (Selena Gomez song), 2020
 "Boyfriend" (Dove Cameron song), 2022
 "Boyfriends", by Harry Styles from Harry's House, 2022

Other
 Boyfriend (fashion), a style of women's clothing
 Boyfriend (manga), a 1985 Japanese manga series
 The Boyfriend (novel), a 2003 novel by R. Raj Rao
 Boyfriend, the player character from the indie rhythm game Friday Night Funkin'

See also
Ex-boyfriend